Our Favourite Shop is the second studio album by the English group the Style Council. It was released on 8 June 1985, on Polydor, and was recorded ten months after the band's debut Café Bleu. It features guest vocalists, including Lenny Henry, Tracie Young, and Dee C Lee. The album contained "Come to Milton Keynes", "The Lodgers", "Boy Who Cried Wolf", and "Walls Come Tumbling Down!" which were all released as singles, with corresponding music videos. The three singles that were released in the UK all reached the top 40 on the UK charts.  The album was released as Internationalists in the United States, with a reconfigured track listing.

Style Council's most commercially successful album, it was an immediate commercial and critical success, and remained at the top of the charts for one week, displacing Brothers in Arms by Dire Straits. The album was the Style Council's only number one album in the UK. According to the BPI, the record sold over 100,000 copies, and was certified gold.

The multigenre album incorporates diverse stylistic influences, including soul, rap, jazz and rock styles. Recording was completed in March 1985. The cover, depicting the band posing inside a shop, was designed by Paul Weller and British artist Simon Halfon.

Contents

The album features fourteen original compositions (eight by Paul Weller, four co-written by Weller and Mick Talbot, and one co-written by Weller with Steve White), with one instrumental from Talbot, in its original British form.

Lyrical targets include racism, excessive consumerism, the effects of self-serving governments, the suicide of one of Weller's friends and what the band saw as an exasperating lack of opposition to the status quo. All of this pessimism is countered with an overarching sense of hope and delight that alternatives do actually exist—if only they can be seen. They also took a more overtly political approach than The Jam in their lyrics, with tracks such as "Walls Come Tumbling Down", "The Lodgers", and "Come to Milton Keynes" being deliberate attacks on 'middle England' and Thatcherite principles prevalent in the 1980s. "A Man of Great Promise" was Weller's eulogy to his school friend and early Jam member - Dave Waller - who had died from a heroin overdose in August 1982.

Release
The majority of the album's material was released (with different sequencing and packaged with an entirely different cover design) in the USA as Internationalists by Geffen Records (which has been a sister label to Polydor Records, the band's UK label, since 1998, under Universal Music Group).

Most countries (except for the original UK pressing) omitted the track "The Stand Up Comic's Instructions" as it was believed that its satire of racist attitudes would be misunderstood. The guest vocalist was the black British comedian, Lenny Henry imitating comedians such as Bernard Manning and Jim Davidson. It was included on the UK, US, and Canada pressing.

Critical reception

In his "Consumer Guide" column for The Village Voice, Robert Christgau wrote: "One reason Paul Weller's rock and roll never convinced non-Brits was his reedy voice, which he has no trouble bending to the needs of the fussy phonographic cabaret he undertook so quixotically and affectedly after retiring the Jam. I'm sure the move has cost him audience, but the new format suits the specifics of his socialism."

Retrospectively, Stephen Thomas Erlewine of AllMusic wrote that Our Favourite Shop "was still quite eclectic, but it didn't seem as schizophrenically diverse as Café Bleu", praising it as a "more cohesive and stronger" album.

Track listing

All songs written by Paul Weller, except where noted.

Later CD issues included "Shout to the Top!" ("Vision Quest" Version) as a bonus track.

Additional track listing

Personnel
The Style Council
Paul Weller – vocals; guitars; bass guitar; synth
Mick Talbot – Hammond organ; keyboards; vocals (track 1)
Steve White – drums; percussion
Dee C. Lee – vocals

Guest vocalists
Lenny Henry – vocals
Tracie Young – vocals
Alison Limerick – vocals

Session musicians
Camille Hinds – bass
Stewart Prosser – trumpet; flugelhorn
David DeFries – trumpet; flugelhorn
Mike Mower – flute; saxophone
Chris Lawrence – trombone
Clark Kent – contra bass
Gary Wallis – percussion
John Mealing – orchestration; string arrangement
Anne Stephenson – violin
Charlie Buchanan – violin
Jocelyn Pook – viola
Audrey Riley – cello
Peter Wilson – keyboard Sequencing
Patrick Grundy-White – French Horn
Steve Dawson – trumpet
Billy Chapman – saxophone
Kevin Miller – bass
Helen Turner – piano

Charts

Weekly charts

Year-end charts

Certifications

References

External links

1985 albums
The Style Council albums
Polydor Records albums
Political music albums by English artists